The Robert F. Kennedy silver dollar is a commemorative coin issued by the United States Mint in 1998. It honors former United States Attorney General, U.S. Senator from New York, and assassinated presidential candidate Robert F. Kennedy.

Legislation 
The act allowed the coins to be struck in both proof and uncirculated finishes.

Design 

The obverse of the Robert F. Kennedy dollar, designed by Thomas D. Rogers, features a portrait of Kennedy.  The reverse, designed by James Peed, portrays the Seal of the Department of Justice overlapped by the Seal of the United States Senate. Robert Kennedy had served in both of these organizations.

Specifications

 Display Box Color: Maroon
 Edge: Reeded
 Weight: 26.730 grams; 0.8594 troy ounce
 Diameter: 38.10 millimeters; 1.50 inches
 Composition: 90% Silver, 10% Copper

See also

 List of United States commemorative coins and medals (1990s)
 United States commemorative coins

References

1998 establishments in the United States
Modern United States commemorative coins
Cultural depictions of Robert F. Kennedy
Eagles on coins